The Fort Myers Sun Sox were one of the eight original franchises that began play in the Senior Professional Baseball Association in 1989. The club was managed by Pat Dobson, while Joe Coleman, Dyar Miller, Jerry Terrell and Tony Torchia served as coaches. The Sun Sox played their home games at Terry Park in Fort Myers.

The Sun Sox finished their inaugural season in second place in the Southern Division with a 37–35 record. Their offense was led by the league's top hitter, Tim Ireland, who posted a .374 batting average, while Kim Allen topped the circuit with 33 stolen bases and Amos Otis belted 11 home runs. Unfortunately, the Sun Sox were eliminated by the Bradenton Explorers in the playoffs.

The following season, ownership squabbles in Fort Myers caused the Sun Sox to fold and the league to cease operations less than halfway through its second season.

The statistics for all teams that played the 1989–90 season were published in the Sporting News on February 12, 1990, pages 30–31 "Assessing the Boys of Winter".

Notable players

Kim Allen
Bud Anderson
Alan Ashby
Doug Bird
Manny Castillo 
Marty Castillo
Dave Collins
Don Cooper 
Dick Drago
Dan Driessen
Pepe Frías
Marv Foley
Rich Gale
Wayne Garland 
Larry Harlow
Tim Hosley
Don Hood
Tim Ireland
Ron Jackson
Bobby Jones
Odell Jones
Ken Kravec
Rafael Landestoy
Dave LaRoche 
Johnnie LeMaster
Dennis Leonard
Steve Luebber
Rick Manning
Jerry Martin
Steve McCatty
Eddie Milner
Bob Molinaro
Amos Otis
Pat Putnam
Ron Pruitt
Mike Ramsey
Eric Rasmussen 
Dan Rohn
Gilberto Rondón
Roger Slagle
Jim Slaton
Tom Spencer
Champ Summers 
Jerry Terrell
Rick Waits
Jerry White

Sources

 

Senior Professional Baseball Association teams
1989 establishments in Florida
Baseball teams established in 1989
Baseball in Fort Myers, Florida
Defunct baseball teams in Florida
1990 disestablishments in Florida
Baseball teams disestablished in 1990